The Volta Prize (French: prix Volta) was originally established by Napoleon III during the Second French Empire in 1852 to honor Alessandro Volta, an Italian physicist noted for developing the electric battery. This international prize awarded 50,000 French francs to extraordinary scientific discoveries related to electricity. The prize was instituted by the Ministry of Public Instruction with the personal funding of the French Emperor, the selection committee was usually constituted by members of the French Academy of Sciences.

Notable recipients have included, Heinrich Ruhmkorff, who commercialised the induction coil, and Zénobe Gramme, inventor of the Gramme dynamo and the first practical electric motor used in industry.

One of its most notable awards was made in 1880, when Alexander Graham Bell received the fourth edition of the Volta Prize for the invention of the telephone. Among the committee members who judged were Victor Hugo and Alexandre Dumas, fils. Since Bell was himself becoming more affluent, he used the prize money to create institutions in and around Washington, D.C., including the prestigious Volta Laboratory Association in 1880 (also known as the 'Volta Laboratory' and as the 'Alexander Graham Bell Laboratory) precursor to Bell Labs, with his endowment fund (the 'Volta Fund'), and then in 1887 the 'Volta Bureau', which later became the Alexander Graham Bell Association for the Deaf and Hard of Hearing (AG Bell).

The prize was discontinued in 1888.

 Inspiration 

The Volta prize was inspired on the earlier French Academy of Sciences Galvanism Prize created by Napoleon Bonaparte in 1801. A Grand Prize of 60,000 francs and a medal of 30,000 francs to be given for discoveries similar to those of Volta and Benjamin Franklin. The Grand Prize never found a deserving recipient.

Only four recipients received a secondary reward of 30,000 francs from the Galvanism Prize:

 1806 Paul Erman.
 1807 Sir Humphry Davy.
 1809 Shared between Joseph Louis Gay-Lussac and Baron Louis Jacques Thénard.

Additionally, the founder of the Volta prize and next Emperor of the French, Louis-Napoléon Bonaparte (Napoleon III), nephew of Bonaparte, was himself very invested in the development of electric science. He presented his own voltaic pile at the French Academy of Sciences in 1843, made out of a single metal and two acid solutions.

 Nomination rules and prize 
The rules of the Volta Prize were decreed by Napoleon III in Paris, on 23 February 1852.  The decree contains five articles:

Article 1: A prize of 50,000 French francs to be awarded to new applications of the voltaic pile in the fields of industry and heat sources, public lightning, chemistry, mechanics, and/or medicine.
Article 2: Scientists and inventors from all nationalities are admitted in the competition.
Article 3: The prize is open to claim for five years.
Article 4: A committee is to be established to analyse the breakthrough of each of the contestants and to recognize if it fills the necessary conditions.
Article 5: The Ministers of France are in charge of the execution of the present decree.

The articles descriptions above are not a literal translation from the original French articles.

The sum of money, 50,000 francs, was approximately $10,000 US dollars at that time (about $ in current dollars), more than five times the annual salary of a Paris Faculty Professor at that time. Between the members of the committee, Edmond Becquerel and Jean-Baptiste Dumas were known to be reporters in certain editions.

 Recipients 
All the Volta Prize editions are listed below:1858 No prize awarded. Honorary medals were awarded to Heinrich Ruhmkorff, Paul-Gustave Froment and Duchenne de Boulogne.1863 Heinrich Ruhmkorff, for developing the Ruhmkorff coil.1871 No prize awarded.1880 Alexander Graham Bell, for invention of the telephone. A secondary prize of 20,000 francs was awarded to Zénobe Gramme.1888' Zénobe Gramme, for his labours in introducing and perfecting the continuous-current dynamo.

See also 

 Alexander Graham Bell honors and tributes
 Edison Volta Prize
 List of physics awards

Notes

References 

Physics awards
French awards
Awards established in 1852
Alessandro Volta
1852 establishments in France